The 1970 New Zealand rugby union tour of South Africa was a series of matches played between June and August 1970 in South Africa and Rhodesia by the All Blacks.

It was one of the longest tours for the All Blacks. It began with two exhibition matches in Australia. An Australian player, Jamie Hendrie, was called to replace the scrum half Sid Going who did not play on Sunday.

For the All Blacks it was a comeback 10 years after the tour of 1960 when the New Zealand rugby union continued to exclude Maori and non-white players from the team in order to accommodate the South African apartheid laws.

The New Zealand Rugby Union refused any other tours for the successive 10 years until New Zealand players of all backgrounds were given the status of "Honorary Whites" allowing them to participate in the 1970 tour under apartheid laws.

Results 

Scores and results list All Blacks' points tally first.

Training match in Australia

Tour

Notes and references

External links 

New Zealand
tour
tour
New Zealand national rugby union team tours of South Africa
Rugby union and apartheid